Ian Robert Snook (born 7 May 1950) is a former New Zealand cricketer who played for Central Districts between 1972 and 1988. He scored his maiden first-class century in his last first-class match in 1987-88. He also played for Taranaki in the Hawke Cup competition. He was born in Dunedin.

Snook holds the unusual record for the most runs conceded by a bowler in a 1 over spell in first-class cricket. Playing for Central Districts against the touring England team at Palmerston North during the 1983–84 season, Snook's only over cost 32 runs, courtesy of some big hitting by Ian Botham.

Snook was also a talented rugby player, representing Taranaki at first five, and then Wairarapa-Bush, in the late seventies. He has coached Clifton's Senior A side in the Taranaki club rugby competition and now coaches Francis Douglas Memorial College's 1st XV along with former Taranaki hooker Shane MacDonald. Snooks writes a weekly sports column in the Taranaki Daily News.

References

1950 births
Living people
New Zealand cricketers
Central Districts cricketers